The first group stage of the 2000–01 UEFA Champions League was played from 12 September to 8 November 2000. 16 winners from the third qualifying round, 10 champions from countries ranked 1–10, and six second-placed teams from countries ranked 1–6 were drawn into eight groups of four teams each. The top two teams in each group advanced to the second group stage, and the third placed team in each group advanced to round 3 of the 2000–01 UEFA Cup.

Deportivo La Coruña, Hamburg, Heerenveen, Helsingborg, Leeds United, Lyon and Shakhtar Donetsk made their debut in the first group stage.

Seeding
Seeding was determined by the UEFA coefficients. Clubs from the same association were split between groups A–D and E–H, ensuring that they not play on the same day if possible.

Groups

Group A

Group B

Group C

Group D

Group E

Group F

Group G

Group H

References

External links
 2000–01 group stage matches at UEFA.com

Group Stage 1
2000-01 1